The following is a discography of Pantera, an American heavy metal band. Pantera formed in the early 1980s and released four studio albums in their early years through its own record label, Metal Magic Records. The band's major-label debut, Cowboys from Hell (1990), peaked at number 27 on the US Billboard Heatseekers chart, and was certified platinum by the Recording Industry Association of America (RIAA). The following year, Cowboys from Hell: The Videos was released; it included video clips produced for Cowboys from Hell. The video was certified gold by the RIAA.

Pantera's second major-label album, Vulgar Display of Power (1992), reached number 44 on the Billboard 200, and was later certified platinum by the Australian Recording Industry Association and the RIAA. Vulgar Display of Power produced two singles, "Mouth for War" and "Walk"; both songs have accompanying music videos included on 1993's Vulgar Video. Like its predecessor, this video was certified platinum by the RIAA. After touring for two years, the group released Far Beyond Driven (1994), which debuted atop of the US Billboard 200 and Australian ARIA charts, reached the top five in Sweden and the United Kingdom, and was certified platinum in Canada and the U.S. The album produced three singles: "5 Minutes Alone", "I'm Broken", and the Black Sabbath cover, "Planet Caravan"; the latter reached the top 30 in the U.S. Mainstream Rock Tracks and UK singles chart. The Great Southern Trendkill (1996) peaked at numbers two and four on the US Billboard 200 and Australian ARIA charts respectively, and reached the top five on the Finland YLE lista and New Zealand RIANZ charts.

Official Live: 101 Proof (1997) reached the top 20 in four countries, and was certified gold by the RIAA. Later that year, the band issued 3 Watch It Go, which features music videos for all singles of Far Beyond Driven, and another for the song "Drag the Waters" from The Great Southern Trendkill. It was certified platinum by the RIAA. 3 Vulgar Videos from Hell (1999) combines the band's previous home videos into a DVD. It was certified platinum in the US and Australia. Pantera's final studio album, Reinventing the Steel (2000), became their second release to peak at numbers two and four on the US Billboard 200 and Australian ARIA charts, respectively. The best-of album Far Beyond the Great Southern Cowboys' Vulgar Hits! (2003), which combined the titles of the band's four major-label albums, was released in the US. Although it only reached number 38 on the Billboard 200, the album was certified platinum by RIAA. The international version of the compilation features a different track list; both albums include a bonus DVD with their music videos. Later in that year, Pantera broke up and the band members subsequently formed the groups Hellyeah, Damageplan, Down, and Superjoint Ritual.

Albums

Studio albums

Live albums

Compilation albums

Extended plays

Singles

Guest appearances

Videos

Music videos

Video albums

Notes

References

Citations

Sources 

 
 

Discographies of American artists
Heavy metal group discographies